Tonosí   is a town and corregimiento in Tonosí District, Los Santos Province, Panama with a population of 2,257 as of 2010. It is the seat of Tonosí District. Its population as of 1990 was 1,910; its population as of 2000 was 2,282.

The town is served by Tonosí Airport.

References

Corregimientos of Los Santos Province
Populated places in Los Santos Province